Alice C. Jones (pen name, Alix John; August 25, 1853 – February 27, 1933) was a Canadian novelist and travel writer.

Biography
Jones was born and educated in Halifax, Nova Scotia. She was the daughter of Lieutenant-Governor Alfred Gilpin Jones and Margaret Wiseman Stairs. In the 1880s and 1890s she travelled to Europe and the West Indies. During her travels, she wrote short stories for a number of magazines including The Week and Frank Leslie's Monthly. Her visits to places in the Mediterranean led to the publication of a series of travel essays which appeared in The Week.

When she returned to Halifax after her travels, she turned to writing novels. Her first novel, The Night Hawk was published in 1903 under the pen name, "Alix John". In 1905, she moved to Menton, France and remained there until her death in 1933.

The women in Jones' stories are prominently strong of character which was unusual at the time. Many of her books featured Canadian themes of wilderness and the relationship between environment and character. In 1903, The Canadian Magazine called her the 'leading woman novelist in Canada' and the Oxford Companion to Canadian Literature compared her to Sara Jeannette Duncan in her emphasis on strong women characters.

Works
 The Night Hawk (1901) [written as Alix John]
 Bubbles We Buy (1903)
 Gabriel Praed's Castle (1904)
 Marcus Holbaech's Daughter (1912)
 Flames of Frost (1914)

Source:

References

External links
 

1853 births
1933 deaths
20th-century Canadian novelists
Canadian women novelists
Writers from Halifax, Nova Scotia
Canadian travel writers
Women travel writers
Canadian women non-fiction writers
19th-century Canadian non-fiction writers
19th-century Canadian women writers
Canadian expatriates in France
20th-century Canadian women writers